1948 Olympics  may refer to:

The 1948 Winter Olympics, which were held in St. Moritz, Switzerland
The 1948 Summer Olympics, which were held in London, England